Metallic B.O. is a compilation album by American band the Long Ryders, released in 1989. It was assembled after the Long Ryders disbanded in 1987 by their fan club as an authorized C90 audio cassette release. It contains previously unreleased live recordings and studio outtakes, interspersed with snippets of radio dialogue and music between the actual tracks. The 90 minute tape was subsequently edited down to 75 minutes for CD reissue by Overground Records in 1990, and later by Prima Records in 2000.

Reception 

Trouser Press called it a "spirited cassette-only hodgepodge of live covers, interview snippets and general fooling around". They felt that "with energetically sloppy renditions of tunes by everybody from Dylan to Public Image Ltd (not to mention a dandy version of Michael Jackson's "Billie Jean"), it's a fine epitaph, outlining the Ryders' historical pedigree and distilling the punky edge that rarely made it onto their studio recordings." AllMusic wrote that the album "illustrates the band's power and diversity", and added that "the whole affair has been lovingly and intelligently put together".

Track listing

Note
Track lengths indicate only the actual track, omitting between-song dialogue and snippets of music.

CD reissue
"You're Gonna Miss Me"
"Route 66"
"Brand New Heartache"
"Prisoners of Rock 'N' Roll"
"Dirty Old Town"
"Billy Jean"
"Circle 'Round the Sun"
"Six Days on the Road"
"Anarchy in the U.K."
"Masters of War"
"Sandwich Man"
"Blues Theme"
"P.I.L. Theme"
"I Shall Be Released"
Note
The CD release omits the tracks "Is Anyone Going to San Antone", "I Want You Bad", "What Goes On", and "Greenville Trestle".

Personnel
Credits are adapted from the cassette liner notes, except where noted.
The Long Ryders
Sid Griffin – guitar, harmonica, vocals
Stephen McCarthy – guitar, banjo, mandolin, vocals
Greg Sowders – drums, percussion, vocals
Tom Stevens – bass, double bass, guitar, vocals (except "Brand New Heartache", "Greenville Trestle")
Des Brewer – bass, vocals on "Brand New Heartache"
Larry Chatman – bass, vocals on "Greenville Trestle"
Additional musicians
The Chesterfield Kings – performance on "You're Gonna Miss Me"
Billy Bragg – vocals, guitar on "Route 66"
Dave Pearlman – pedal steel guitar on "Brand New Heartache"
Will Glenn – violin on "Dirty Old Town"
Steve Mack – lead vocals on "P.I.L. Theme"
Damian O'Neill – guitar on "P.I.L. Theme"
Technical
Rick Gershon – compilation producer, editing, liner notes
Bill Inglot – tape preparation, soundboard mix on "Circle 'Round the Sun"  
John Strother – tape editing, engineer 
Sid Griffin – special assistance
Tom Stevens – special assistance
Joey Stella – soundboard mix on "Route 66"
Will Birch – engineer on "Billy Jean"
Neill King – engineer on "Billy Jean"
Ed Stasium – engineer on "Blues Theme"
Paul McKenna – engineer on "Sandwich Man"

References 

1989 compilation albums
The Long Ryders albums